Illinois elected its member August 2, 1819, after the new congress began but before the first session convened.  The incumbent had just been elected to the new seat in late 1818.

See also 
 1818 and 1819 United States House of Representatives elections
 List of United States representatives from Illinois

Notes 

1819
Illinois
United States House of Representatives